Sint-Gillis-Waas is a municipality located in the Belgian province of East Flanders. On 1 January 2018, Sint-Gillis-Waas had a total population of 19,273. The total area is 54.98 km² which gives a population density of 357 inhabitants per km².

References

External links

 Official website 

 
Municipalities of East Flanders
Waasland
Populated places in East Flanders